Mahura is a genus of South Pacific funnel weavers first described by Raymond Robert Forster & C. L. Wilton in 1973 and known only from New Zealand.

Species
 it contains eighteen species:
Mahura accola Forster & Wilton, 1973 — New Zealand
Mahura bainhamensis Forster & Wilton, 1973 — New Zealand
Mahura boara Forster & Wilton, 1973 — New Zealand
Mahura crypta Forster & Wilton, 1973 — New Zealand
Mahura detrita Forster & Wilton, 1973 — New Zealand
Mahura hinua Forster & Wilton, 1973 — New Zealand
Mahura musca Forster & Wilton, 1973 — New Zealand
Mahura rubella Forster & Wilton, 1973 — New Zealand
Mahura rufula Forster & Wilton, 1973 — New Zealand
Mahura scuta Forster & Wilton, 1973 — New Zealand
Mahura sorenseni Forster & Wilton, 1973 — New Zealand
Mahura southgatei Forster & Wilton, 1973 — New Zealand
Mahura spinosa Forster & Wilton, 1973 — New Zealand
Mahura spinosoides Forster & Wilton, 1973 — New Zealand
Mahura takahea Forster & Wilton, 1973 — New Zealand
Mahura tarsa Forster & Wilton, 1973 — New Zealand
Mahura turris Forster & Wilton, 1973 — New Zealand
Mahura vella Forster & Wilton, 1973 — New Zealand

References

Agelenidae
Spiders of New Zealand
Araneomorphae genera
Taxa named by Raymond Robert Forster